Trifurcula rusticula is a moth of the family Nepticulidae. It was described by Edward Meyrick in 1916. It is known from India.

References

Nepticulidae
Moths of Asia
Moths described in 1916